The Fourth Nehru ministry was formed on 2 April 1962 after the Indian National Congress won the 1962 general election.

Cabinet
Key
  Died in office
  Resigned

Cabinet ministers

|}

Ministers of State

|}

References

Indian union ministries
Nehru administration